Coemansia is a genus of fungi in the family Kickxellaceae. It was circumscribed in 1873.

The genus name of Coemansia is in honour of Henri Eugène Lucien Gaëtan Coemans (1825-1871), a Belgian clergyman and botanist (Mycology),
worked in Ghent.

Species
Coemansia aciculifera
Coemansia alma-atensis
Coemansia asiatica
Coemansia bainieri
Coemansia brasiliensis
Coemansia breviramosa
Coemansia ceylonensis
Coemansia erecta
Coemansia furcata
Coemansia guatemalensis
Coemansia interrupta
Coemansia javaensis
Coemansia kamerunensis
Coemansia linderi
Coemansia mojavensis
Coemansia nantahalensis
Coemansia pectinata
Coemansia reversa
Coemansia scorpioidea
Coemansia spiralis
Coemansia thaxteri

References

Zygomycota genera
Enigmatic fungus taxa